Bien may refer to:
 Bien (newspaper)
 Basic Income Earth Network
 Bień, Poland